Orites excelsus, commonly known as prickly ash, mountain silky oak or white beefwood, is a species of flowering plant in the family Proteaceae and is endemic to eastern Australia. It is a medium-sized to tall rainforest tree with oblong to lance-shaped leaves, variously lobed and with teeth on the edges. The flowers are white and arranged in leaf axils in spikes that are shorter than the leaves.

Description
They are usually lobed, usually have teeth regularly arranged along the edges, shiny green on the upper surface and grey to whitish below.

Taxonomy
Orites excelsus was first formally described in 1830 by Robert Brown in Supplementum primum Prodromi florae Novae Hollandiae from specimens collected by Charles Fraser near the Hastings River in 1818.

Frederick Manson Bailey described Orites fragrans from Mounts Bellenden Ker and Bartle Frere, now accepted as an isonym of O. excelsus.

Fossils of lobed leaves closely resembling juvenile leaves of O. excelsus have been recovered from the early to middle Eocene Taratu Formation near Livingstone in northern Otago, New Zealand. They have been provisionally classified as close to this species, though a resemblance to Athertonia diversifolia has been noted.

Distribution and habitat
Orites excelsus is found in cool mountain rainforests from Barrington Tops in New South Wales and north to south-eastern Queensland. It also occurs on Mounts Bellenden-Ker and Bartle Frere in north Queensland. It is associated with yellow carabeen (Sloanea woollsii).

Uses
The timber of prickly ash has been used for shingles, casks, furniture and joinery.

References

excelsus
Proteales of Australia
Flora of New South Wales
Flora of Queensland
Plants described in 1830
Taxa named by Robert Brown (botanist, born 1773)